Seoul Metro 2000 series (2005)
 Seoul Metro 2000 series (first generation)